Ayr is a ghost town in Deaf Smith County, Texas. It was established in the spring of 1890 as an intended spur of the Fort Worth and Denver City Railway to create a shipping point for Roswell, New Mexico, ranches. It was named for the Scottish town of Ayr. Settlers began arriving quickly that spring, and a store and post office were established. As was common at the time, a battle to obtain county seat status ensued between Ayr and another town named Grenada (later renamed La Plata), which had been established by the XIT Ranch. In a contested election, La Plata won the election by a wide margin, and as a result, the rail spur was never built. The town site was abandoned by 1895.

References

Deaf Smith County, Texas
Ghost towns in Texas